Breguet is a Swiss-French luxury watch, clock and jewelry manufacturer founded by Abraham-Louis Breguet in Paris in 1775. Since 1999, it has been a subsidiary of the Swiss Swatch Group. Headquartered in L'Abbaye, Switzerland, Breguet is one of the oldest surviving watchmaking brands and a pioneer of numerous watchmaking technologies such as the tourbillon, which was invented by Abraham Breguet in 1801. Abraham Breguet also invented and produced the world's first self-winding watch (the Perpétuelle) in 1780, as well as the world's first wristwatch in 1810 (the Breguet No.2639, for Caroline Bonaparte, Queen of Naples).

Breguet is a highly regarded watch manufacturer. Over the years, notable Breguet patrons and timepiece owners include King George III, Queen Victoria, Alexandre I of Russia, Napoléon Bonaparte, Ettore Bugatti, Sir Winston Churchill, Sergei Rachmaninoff, Gioachino Rossini, Arthur Rubinstein and so on. In particular, the Breguet & Fils, Paris No. 2667 (1814) pocket watch ranks as one of the world's most expensive watches ever sold at auction, fetching US$4.69 million (CHF 4,339,000) in Geneva in May 2012. The Breguet Sympathique Clock No.128 & 5009 (Duc d'Orléans Breguet Sympathique), on the other hand, currently holds the title of the most expensive Breguet timepiece ever sold at auction, fetching US$6.80 million in New York in December 2012.

History

Early history 

Breguet was founded in 1775 by Abraham-Louis Breguet, a Swiss watchmaker born to Huguenot parents in Neuchâtel.  He studied watchmaking for ten years under Ferdinand Berthoud and Jean-Antoine Lépine before setting up his own watchmaking business at 51 Quai de l'Horloge on the Île de la Cité in Paris. The dowry that came with his marriage to the daughter of a prosperous French bourgeois provided the backing which allowed him to open his own workshop.

Breguet's connections made during his apprenticeship as a watchmaker and as a student of mathematics helped him to establish his business. Following his introduction to the court, Queen Marie Antoinette grew fascinated by Breguet's unique self-winding watch; Louis XVI bought several of his watches. In 1783 the Swedish count Axel Von Fersen, who was the queen's friend and reputed lover, commissioned a watch from Breguet that was to contain every watch complication known at that time as a gift to Marie Antoinette. The result is a Breguet's masterpiece, the Marie-Antoinette pocket watch (Breguet No.160).

The business was a success, and around 1807 Abraham-Louis Breguet took on his son Louis-Antoine as his partner, renaming the firm "Breguet et Fils" (Breguet and Sons). Louis-Antoine took over the firm upon the death of his father in 1823. After Louis-Antoine retired in 1833 (he died in 1858) the business was passed to Abraham-Louis' grandson Louis Clément Francois (1804–1883).

Abraham-Louis' great-grandson Louis Antoine (1851–1882) was the last of the Breguet family to run the business. Although he had two sons and a daughter, they did not enter the business, so the Breguet company hired noted English watchmaker Edward Brown of Clerkenwell to manage the Paris factory. Brown eventually became a partner and, after Breguet's grandson's death, the owner and head of the company. When Brown died in 1895 the firm was taken over by his sons, Edward and Henry. On Edward's retirement in the early 1900s, Henry Brown became the head of the firm.

Recent development 
From 1870 to 1970, Breguet was owned by the English Brown family. The Brown family were of English origin, Edward Brown was prominent factory manager who acquired Breguet from Abraham-Louis’ grandson, Louis-François, an  engineer. Brown managed the brand through the turbulent French politics of the late 19th century. It was only after Edward’s death that the firm saw its sales rise near the levels it enjoyed before 1870. Edward’s son, Edouard, took over the business until 1912 when his brother Henry took over. After the Brown family, the ownership changed hands several times during the quartz crisis in the 1970s and 1980s. In 1976, Breguet's then-owner Chaumet closed its French factory and moved production to the Vallée de Joux in Switzerland.

In 1987, Breguet was acquired by Investcorp which, in 1991, created the Groupe Horloger Breguet (GHB). The Breguet Group consists of four subsidiaries: Montres Breguet SA, Breguet SA, Valdar SA and Nouvelle Lemania SA (which Breguet Group acquired in 1992). As a result, Breguet-brand watches are now made at the Nouvelle Lemania factory in Switzerland. In particular, Montres Breguet SA is the main company that sells timepieces under the brand name of "Breguet", and Breguet SA is the name of Breguet Group's distribution company in France.

In 1999, Groupe Horloger Breguet was acquired by the Swatch Group from Investcorp. Breguet is an active member of the Federation of the Swiss Watch Industry FH.

Motto and slogan 
One of Breguet's company mottoes is "In every woman is a queen." The motto was introduced for Breguet's lady's collection, the Reine de Naples collection.

Watch manufacturing

Breguet watches are often easily recognized for their coin-edge cases, guilloché dials and blue pomme hands (often now referred to as 'Breguet hands'). In addition to watches, Breguet also manufactures writing instruments, women's jewelry, and cufflinks.

Notable inventions and patents 
The following are some of the important inventions of Abraham-Louis Breguet and Breguet company.

 In 1780, invented and produced the world's self-winding/automatic watch (the Perpétuelle).
In 1783, invented the Gong-spring, laying the foundation for minute repeaters.
 In 1783, invented the Breguet hands.
 In 1790, invented the Pare-chute, one of the world's first shock protection systems.
 In 1795, invented the Breguet overcoil or Breguet spiral, being widely used in watchmaking industry to this day.
 In 1801, invented tourbillon, balancing the effect of gravity.
 In 1810, invented and produced the world's first wristwatch (Breguet No. 2639).
 In 1830, Breguet produces the first watch wound without a key, equipped with a knurled knob for winding and setting the time.
In 1929, created the world's first (possibly) perpetual calendar movement for wristwatches (Breguet No. 2516).
 In 2010, patented the magnetic pivot, used to improve watch precision using magnetism.
In 2010, introduced the magnetic strike governor.

Environmental rating 

In December 2018, World Wide Fund for Nature (WWF) released an official report giving environmental ratings for 15 major watch manufacturers and jewelers in Switzerland. Breguet, along with 7 other manufacturers including Patek Philippe, Audemars Piguet and Rolex, was given the lowest environmental rating as "Latecomers/Non-transparent", suggesting that the manufacturer has taken very few actions addressing the impact of its manufacturing activities on the environment and climate change.

There are concerns over the lack of transparency in manufacturing activities and the sourcing of precious raw materials such as gold, which is a major cause of environmental issues such as pollution, soil degradation and deforestation. The situation is especially serious in the developing countries which are top producers of gold, including China, Russia and South Africa. It is estimated that the watch and jewelry sector uses over 50% of world's annual gold production (over 2,000 tons), but in most cases the watch companies are not able to or are unwilling to demonstrate where their raw materials come from and if the material suppliers use eco-friendly sourcing technologies.

Notable models

Most expensive pieces 

 In May 2012, a Breguet pocket watch, the Breguet & Fils, Paris No.2667, was sold in Christie's Geneva auction with a final price of US$4.69 million (CHF 4,339,000).
 In May 2012, a Breguet pocket watch, the Breguet, Paris, No.4111, was sold in Christie's Geneva auction with a final price of US$2.75 million (CHF 2,547,000).
In December 2012, the Breguet Sympathique Clock No.128 & 5009 (Duc d'Orléans Breguet Sympathique, owned by Ferdinand Philippe, Duke of Orléans) was auctioned by Sotheby's for US$6.8 million in New York, making it the most expensive Breguet timepiece ever sold at auction. The clock was auctioned by Sotheby's for the first time in 1999, fetching a record-breaking US$5,777,500 in New York, after the shutdown of the celebrated Time Museum in Rockford, Illinois.
In May 2016, a pocket watch, the Breguet & Fils, No.217, was sold in Christie's Geneva auction for US$3.33 million (CHF 3,245,000).

Marie-Antoinette pocket watch 
In 1783, an admirer of Marie Antoinette, the Queen of France, commissioned a watch from Abraham-Louis Breguet as a gift for the Queen. The requirement was that the watch should be "as spectacular as possible, incorporating the fullest range of horological expertise known at the time". There was no time deadline or financial limit with the commission.

The final product was the Breguet No.160 grand complication (Marie-Antoinette pocket watch). However, the watch was only finished in 1827, 34 years after the death of the Queen during French Revolution, and four years after the death of Abraham-Louis Breguet (the watch was eventually completed by the son of Abraham Breguet). In total, it took 44 years to make the watch.

The watch had been kept in the Museum for Islamic Art in Jerusalem until it was stolen in 1983. In 2007, the watch was eventually recovered and returned to the museum.

Gentleman's collection 

Classique: Simple, Grandes Complications – popular round pieces, usually with reeded casebands and soldered lugs;
The Classique Tourbillon Extra-Flat, available in rose gold or platinum.
The Classique Small Seconds, available in rose gold or in white gold.
La Marine – water-resistant, distinguished by the presence of crown guards;
Heritage – tonneau-shaped cases;
Type XX, XXI, XXII – sports chronographs, based on World War II-era pilots' watches;
The Type XXII Flyback Chronograph, available in rose gold.
Tradition – similar to the long gone Souscription by Breguet, open-faced watches with the movement on the front, along with a small face.

Lady's collection 

Classique;
La Marine;
Heritage;
Type XX;

Reine de Naples – oval bezels.

Notable patrons and owners

Artists 

Alexander Pushkin, Russian  poet

Giovanni Paisiello, Italian composer
Sergei Rachmaninoff, Russian composer
Gioachino Rossini, Italian composer
Arthur Rubinstein, Polish-American pianist
Horace Vernet, French painter

Entrepreneurs 

 Ettore Bugatti, Italian-French automobile designer & founder of the Bugatti

Intellectuals 

 Marquis de Condorcet, French philosopher and mathematician

Politicians 

Nicolas Sarkozy, 23rd President of France
Charles Maurice de Talleyrand, Prime Minister of France
Michel Ney, Marshal of France
Vladimir Putin, President of Russia
Dmitry Medvedev, Prime Minister of Russia
Sir Winston Churchill, Prime Minister of the United Kingdom, 1953 Nobel Literature Prize winner
1st Duke of Wellington, Prime Minister of the United Kingdom

Royalty 

Fuad I of Egypt, King of Egypt
Farouk of Egypt, King of Egypt
Napoléon Bonaparte, Emperor of France
Empress Joséphine, first Empress of France
Marie Louise, Duchess of Parma, second Empress of France
Louis XVI and Marie Antoinette, King and Queen of France
Louis XVIII, King of France
Caroline Bonaparte, Queen of Naples
Selim III, Sultan of Ottoman Empire
Alexandre I, Tsar of Russia
George III, King of the United Kingdom
George IV, King of the United Kingdom
Queen Victoria, Queen of the United Kingdom
Edward VIII, King of the United Kingdom and Duke of Windsor

See also 
 List of watch manufacturers
Manufacture d'horlogerie

References

External links

 Official site
 Breguet watches in the Hermitage Museum
 The history of Breguet (Time and Watches)
Breguet 1747–1823 – online edition of the seminal 1921 biography by Sir David Salomons, hosted by Archive.org

1775 establishments in France
Companies based in the canton of Vaud
Watch manufacturing companies of Switzerland
Swiss watch brands
Luxury brands
The Swatch Group
Comité Colbert members
French companies established in 1775
Manufacturing companies established in 1775